These are the Billboard Hot 100 number-one hits of 1984. Overall, Prince spent the most weeks at number one in 1984, reigning for seven weeks at the top with "When Doves Cry" and "Let's Go Crazy" (with the Revolution). However, "Like a Virgin" by Madonna had the longest run at number one of any song which rose into the top position during 1984. Though it spent only two weeks at number one at the end of the year, it went on to spend an additional four weeks at the top to begin 1985, for a total of six weeks.

That year, 15 acts achieved their first number one song, such as Yes, Culture Club, Van Halen, Kenny Loggins, Phil Collins, Cyndi Lauper, Duran Duran, Prince, Ray Parker Jr., Tina Turner, John Waite, The Revolution, Billy Ocean, Wham!, and Madonna. Prince was the only act to hit number one more than once that year, with two.

Chart history

Number-one artists

See also
1984 in music
List of Cash Box Top 100 number-one singles of 1984

References

Additional sources
Fred Bronson's Billboard Book of Number 1 Hits, 5th Edition
Joel Whitburn's Top Pop Singles 1955-2008, 12 Edition
Joel Whitburn Presents the Billboard Hot 100 Charts: The Eighties
Additional information obtained can be verified within Billboard's online archive services and print editions of the magazine.

United States Hot 100
1984